Rob Rainford (born November 30, 1966) is a Canadian chef, author of Rob Rainford's Born to Grill and former host of Licence to Grill (LTG) on the Food Network Canada, Discovery Home (in the United States) and Asian Food Channel (across Asia). He was born in Saint Andrew Parish, Jamaica, before moving to Canada with his family at the age of three. Rainford completed his culinary school at George Brown College in 1994.

Career 
Rob Rainford is best known for hosting the TV series, License to Grill, which involves backyard cooking, entertaining and barbecuing. Rainford is tasked with hosting gatherings at his home where he prepares a meal while sharing tips and tricks for cooking on a barbecue. The techniques shared range from typical barbecue fare, such as hamburgers, steaks, and kebabs, to more complex meals, including legs of lamb, hot smoking and grilled desserts. In season 2, Rainford cooked a meal inspired by the movie, The Godfather. The movie inspired an Italian meal, with Rainford ending the night off with his impersonate of Marlon Brando. In another episode, Rainford hosted a 70's themed gathering, where he dressed for the occasion by wearing an afro wig. His signature line from the show has been "look at those beautiful char marks!"  

On May 8, 2012, Rainford released his book, Rob Rainford's Born to Grill. The book includes over 100 recipes and 20 complete menus, all designed for a backyard barbeque. Born to Grill includes advice on the tools and equipment teaching readers how to grill like a pro. It also unveils the "Rainford Method" - a set of techniques designed to help his readers take their barbeque to the next level. 

Other positions Rainford held after completing his formal culinary training include: 

 Kensington Kitchen
 Accolade/Crown Plaza
 Senses
 Chef Instructor at George Brown College Continuing Education Program (Sept 2002 to 2014)
Culinary Ambassador and Chef Faculty School of Hospitality, Tourism & Culture at Centennial College (2014 to 2016)
Rainford also starred in Fresh Cooking, a video series released in 2007 and sold through supermarket chains, particularly those owned by SuperValu. He also hosted a video series on Food Network Canada's official website entitled Cooking Moments where special guest chefs are invited to help Rainford in the kitchen.

References

External links
Rob Rainford at the Chef and Restaurant Database

Black Canadian broadcasters
Jamaican emigrants to Canada
Canadian television chefs
Living people
1966 births
George Brown College alumni
Canadian male chefs